Alcoa Sports Club Ground is a cricket ground at Halse Hall in Jamaica.

History
The home of the Alcoa Sports Club (formerly Jamalco Sports Club), the ground has played host to the Jamaica national cricket team for one major cricket match, a List A one-day match against the Windward Islands in the 1984–85 Geddes Grant/Harrison Line Trophy. In a low-scoring match, the Windward Islands won by 2 wickets. A second one-day match was later played at the ground in the 2003–04 Red Stripe Bowl between the Windward Islands and Canada, which the Windward Islands won by 127 runs.

See also
List of cricket grounds in the West Indies

Notes and references

External links
Alcoa Sports Club Ground at ESPNcricinfo

Cricket grounds in Jamaica
Sports venues in Jamaica